Søren Hansen (born 21 March 1974) is a Danish professional golfer.

Hansen was born in Copenhagen, Denmark. He won the 1997 Danish Amateur Stroke Play Championship  and turned professional later that year.

Hansen collected his first professional win at the Challenge Tour's 1998 Navision Open Golf Championship in his home country. Since 1999 he has been a member of the European Tour where he has picked up two tournament victories. He won the 2002 Murphy's Irish Open, where he won at the fourth extra hole in a play-off against Richard Bland, Niclas Fasth and Darren Fichardt. He also won the 2007 Mercedes-Benz Championship by a margin of four strokes. His best Order of Merit finish is 8th in 2007. He represented Europe in the 2008 Ryder Cup matches, but he did not win a match, the U.S. was victorious.

In September 2007, he reached the top 50 of the Official World Golf Rankings and became the top-ranked Danish golfer.

Hansen represented Denmark in the World Cup in 1998, 2001, 2002, 2005 and 2007.

On 11 August 2009, Hansen was charged with tax evasion by Danish authorities for allegedly claiming residency of Monaco, while actually living in Denmark. On 19 May 2010, Hansen was fined nearly $1.1 million for tax evasion.

Amateur wins
1997 Danish Amateur Stroke Play Championship

Professional wins (3)

European Tour wins (2)

European Tour playoff record (1–0)

Challenge Tour wins (1)

Playoff record
Other playoff record (0–1)

Results in major championships

CUT = missed the half-way cut
"T" = tied

Summary

Most consecutive cuts made – 3 (2009 U.S. Open – 2009 PGA)
Longest streak of top-10s – 2 (2009 U.S. Open – 2009 Open Championship)

Results in The Players Championship

"T" indicates a tie for a place

Results in World Golf Championships

QF, R16, R32, R64 = Round in which player lost in match play
"T" = Tied
Note that the HSBC Champions did not become a WGC event until 2009.

Team appearances
Amateur
European Youths' Team Championship (representing Denmark): 1990, 1994
European Amateur Team Championship (representing Denmark): 1995, 1997

Professional
World Cup (representing Denmark): 1998, 2001, 2002, 2005, 2006, 2007, 2008, 2009
Seve Trophy (representing Continental Europe): 2007, 2009
Ryder Cup (representing Europe): 2008
Royal Trophy (representing Europe): 2009, 2010 (winners)

Sources:

References

External links

Danish male golfers
European Tour golfers
Ryder Cup competitors for Europe
Sportspeople from Copenhagen
1974 births
Living people